Lepidophanes gaussi is a species of lanternfish distributed in the North Atlantic and South Atlantic gyres.

References

Myctophidae
Fish described in 1906